Tom Egberink (born 22 December 1992) is a Dutch wheelchair tennis player. Egberink is a major champion, having won the 2012 Wimbledon Championships in doubles, and a two-time Paralympic medalist, with a silver and bronze from singles and doubles, respectively, at the 2020 Tokyo Paralympics.

Match highlights
On the 2012 Wimbledon Championships he was playing doubles with Michael Jeremiasz of France against two-time Wimbledon champions Robin Ammerlaan and Ronald Vink both of which were from the Netherlands as well. The match started with a 5–2 lead which ended with 6–4 due to the opponents constant errors. The second set brought even more victory for Egberink and Jeremiasz with the score of 2–1. Unfortunately, the rain got in a way when they were 40–0 in the fourth game. After the game resumed an hour later Egberink and Jeremiasz won the first point but the opponents got the point next as well. In the second set the Dutch duo was unable to control forehands resulting in 6–2 win for Tom and Michael in the second set.

References

External links
 
 

1992 births
Living people
Dutch male tennis players
Wheelchair tennis players
Paralympic wheelchair tennis players of the Netherlands
Paralympic silver medalists for the Netherlands
Paralympic bronze medalists for the Netherlands
Paralympic medalists in wheelchair tennis
Medalists at the 2020 Summer Paralympics
Wheelchair tennis players at the 2012 Summer Paralympics
Wheelchair tennis players at the 2016 Summer Paralympics
Wheelchair tennis players at the 2020 Summer Paralympics
People from Hardenberg
Sportspeople from Overijssel
21st-century Dutch people